Ramana Madhesh (born 23 December 1971) is an Indian film director, producer and writer in Tamil cinema. He is mainly known for his debut film Madhurey (2004) and Vijayakanth's 150th film Arasangam (2008).

Career
Madhesh is film director and producer in Tamil cinema. He has also distributed many movies like Thulluvadho Ilamai (2002) and Villain (2002).
He started out in Tamil cinema by bankrolling Shankar's Mudhalvan (1999), which turned out to be a blockbuster and was subsequently remade into a Bollywood film under the title Nayak (2001).

After the success of his directorial debut with Vijay in Madhurey (2004), Madhesh has helmed a handful of movies, notable among which are the crime thriller Arasangam (2008) and the action comedy Mirattal (2012). Besides these, he has also written and directed the 2016 Marathi movie Friends. In 2018, Madhesh directed the Tamil horror thriller  Mohini, which starred Trisha Krishnan in the lead role.
As of 2019, Madhesh is writing and directing feature film titled "Sandakari" with Vemal and Shriya Saran. In this film Madhesh has finished almost 70 percent of the film in UK London. The production company released the first look poster with Shriya Saran and Vemal which is a runaway hit. The film was scheduled to be released in November 2021

Filmography

References

External links
 
 The Official Website

Tamil film directors
21st-century Indian film directors
Living people
Tamil film producers
Tamil screenwriters
1971 births